A zone of binocular occlusion refers to a zone of the visual field that is not visible to either eye; in particular it may refer to:
 in ophthalmology, the use of eye patches over both eyes,
 in ophthalmology and vision therapy, binasal occlusion in which a very large sector is occluded.